Horsefly weed, horsefly-weed, or horseflyweed is a common name for several plants, and may refer to: 

Baptisia australis, native to central and eastern United States
Baptisia tinctoria, native to the eastern United States

Faboideae